Bobbey Ah Fang Suan is a Malaysian politician. He served as the Member of Sabah State Legislative Assembly (MLA) for Nabawan from March 2004 until September 2020. He has also served as the State Minister of Special Duties in May 2018. He is a member of the Parti Gagasan Rakyat Sabah (GAGASAN), which is a major component of the ruling Gabungan Rakyat Sabah (GRS) coalition both in federal and state levels.

Election results

Honours 
  :
  Commander of the Order of Kinabalu (PGDK) - Datuk (2006)

References

Living people
Year of birth missing (living people)
People from Sabah
Members of the Sabah State Legislative Assembly
Malaysian United Indigenous Party politicians
21st-century Malaysian politicians